Schwedenstein is a mountain of Saxony, southeastern Germany.

Mountains of Saxony
Bautzen (district)